Structure-mapping theory is a theory of analogical reasoning, developed by Dedre Gentner, and for which she was awarded the 2016 David E. Rumelhart Prize for Contributions to the Theoretical Foundations of Human Cognition.

Distinguishing analogy from other comparisons

Structure-mapping theory aims to improve upon previous theories of analogy, by distinguishing analogy from literal similarity. Previous theories, like Amos Tversky's contrast theory, assumed that an analogy is stronger, the more attributes the base and target have in common. Instead, structure-mapping theory recognizes that there can be differences between base and target domains which make no difference to the strength of the analogy. For example, we can see a battery as being like a reservoir despite them being different in shape, size, color and substance.

Structure-mapping theory respond by arguing that it is not object attributes which are mapped in an analogy. Instead the theory contends that an analogy alerts the hearer to a similarity in the relationships between objects in a domain. The distinction is made in terms of the arity of predicates - attributes are predicates with one argument, while relationships are predicates which take two or more arguments. So the proposition "x is large" asserts an attribute, while "x revolves around y" asserts a relationship. (Higher order predicates assert relationships between propositions)

Analogy vs literal similarity

By distinguishing attributes and relationships, we can distinguish literal similarities from analogies.

For example:
 The X12 star system in the Andromeda nebula is like the Solar System. - This is a literal similarity, because the intention is to map both relationships (e.g. between planets and the Sun) and attributes (e.g. the size and temperature of the Sun)
 The hydrogen atom is like the Solar System. (Rutherford, 1906) - This is an analogy, because only relational predicates, like relative motion and size, are to be mapped between domains.

Analogy vs general laws

Analogies can also be distinguished from general laws

 The hydrogen atom is a central force system. - This is a general law, in the sense that the base domain is an abstract domain of relationships, and actually includes no object attributes. Compare this to an analogy, where the base domain includes object attributes, which are excluded from the comparison.

Analogy vs. chronology

The distinction in the role of objects, attributes and relationships in the comparison also allows us to characterize a chronology as a comparison in which objects are compared (remain relatively constant), but relationships are not (i.e. are expected to differ).

Summary table

Gentner provides the following table to summarize the different types of domain comparison above:

Systematicity principle 

"Part of our understanding about analogy is that it conveys a system of connected knowledge, not a mere assortment of independent facts. Such a system can be represented by an interconnected predicate structure in which higher-order predicates enforce connections among lower-order predicates. reflect this tacit preference for coherence in analogy, I propose the systematicity principle: A predicate that belongs to a mappable system of mutually interconnecting relationships is more likely to be imported into the target than is an isolated predicate." (Gentner 1983, p162-163; emphasis added)

The systematicity principle helps to explain why, when comparing the atom to the Solar System, we do not try to map the relative temperature of Sun and the Earth onto the nucleus-electron system. In short, the temperature has no strong connection to the other object relationships - such as distance, attractive force, relative mass, and relative motion (who revolves around who) - which are mapped. What these other relationships share is a strong interdependence - reversing the mass relationship reverses the relative motion relationship, and changing the distance changes the attractive force, and so on.

See also 
 Structure mapping engine

References